A dead cake is a type of food that is traditionally eaten at a wake to honour the deceased individual. It is closely related to the folklore of funeral customs.

In culture 

The 1911 Encyclopædia Britannica states:

...in the Balkan peninsula a small bread image of the deceased is made and eaten by the survivors of the family. The Dutch doed-koecks or 'dead-cakes', marked with the initials of the deceased, introduced into America in the 17th century, were long given to the attendants at funerals in old New York. The 'burial-cakes' which are still made in parts of rural England, for example Lincolnshire and Cumberland, are almost certainly a relic of sin-eating.

Funeral food and drink